Motoyama is a district in Nagoya, Japan.

Motoyama may also refer to:

 Motoyama, Kōchi, a town in Kōchi Prefecture, Japan

People with the surname
 Atsuhiro Motoyama,  Japanese video game music composer
 Hiroshi Motoyama (1925–2015), Japanese parapsychologist, scientist, spiritual instructor and author
 Satoshi Motoyama (born 1971), Japanese professional racing driver

See also
 Motoyama Station (disambiguation), several train stations in Japan

Japanese-language surnames